Fris is a surname. Notable people with the surname include:

Barbara Fris (born 1956), Canadian soprano and actress
Christina Fris (1757–1835), Swedish industrialist and merchant
Edward S. Fris (1921–2010), American lieutenant general
Francesc Gaset Fris (born 1947), Andorran sport shooter
Ihor Fris (born 1973), Ukrainian notary and politician
Jan Friš (born 1995), Czech middle-distance runner
Kristijan Fris (born 1984), Serbian wrestler
Pieter Fris (1627–1706), Dutch Golden Age painter

See also
Frïs Vodka, a Danish vodka brand